The Nestor P. Eaton House, at 313 McCutcheon Ave. in Socorro, New Mexico, dates from around 1893.  It was listed on the National Register of Historic Places in 1991.

It is a one-story brick building, with a flat-roofed front porch supported by three chamfered posts.

References

National Register of Historic Places in Socorro County, New Mexico
Victorian architecture in New Mexico
Houses completed in 1893